Iván Martín Gómez (born 4 March 1995) is a Spanish professional footballer who plays for Real Balompédica Linense as a forward.

Club career
Born in Villaverde del Río, Martín represented UD Villaverde, AD San José as a youth, and made his senior debut with Brenes Balompié in 2012, in Primera Andaluza. After scoring six goals in eight matches, he joined the youth setup of Real Betis in the same year. On 9 February 2014, he made his debut for the reserves in Tercera División, coming on as a substitute for Ismael César García in a 2–0 victory over La Palma CF.

On 9 September 2014, Martín was loaned out to Segunda División B club CD Alcoyano for the upcoming season. However, after struggling to get playing time, he terminated the deal and moved to Écija Balompié on loan on 5 January 2015.

On 31 August 2015, Martín switched to CD Tudelano. He scored his first goal for the club in a 2–1 win against Coruxo FC. On 2 August 2016, he moved to Real Valladolid B on a one-year contract. On 17 August 2017, he signed for Pontevedra CF.

On 12 July 2018, Martín moved abroad and joined Polish club Odra Opole on a two-year contract. Nine days later he made his debut, scoring in a 2–1 victory against GKS Tychy.

References

External links

1995 births
Living people
Association football forwards
Spanish footballers
Segunda División B players
Tercera División players
Betis Deportivo Balompié footballers
CD Alcoyano footballers
Écija Balompié players
CD Tudelano footballers
Real Valladolid Promesas players
Pontevedra CF footballers
Real Balompédica Linense footballers
I liga players
Odra Opole players
Podbeskidzie Bielsko-Biała players
Spanish expatriate footballers
Expatriate footballers in Poland
Spanish expatriate sportspeople in Poland